Yaamirukka Bayamey is a 2014 Indian Tamil-language horror comedy film written and directed by debutant Deekay and produced by Elred Kumar. The cast includes Kreshna, Oviya, Rupa Manjari, Karunakaran,  and Anaswara Kumar. 15 technicians were introduced in the film, which started shooting in Nainital in October. Previously titled as Illa Aanalum Irukku, the film released on 9 May 2014  and received positive reviews. The film was later remade into Kannada as Namo Boothatma and in Telugu as Next Nuvve. Yaamirukka Bayamey is based on the 1998 Korean film The Quiet Family.

Plot
Kiran (Kreshna) is a TV telemarketer who gets into trouble after one of his products has an opposite effect than what was intended, on the son of a local thug (Mahanadhi Shankar) who acted the commercial for him. That is also the moment when he discovers that his ‘real’ father left him a bungalow on an estate in a small town. He cons the son of the don, escapes with the money along with his girlfriend Smitha (Rupa Manjari), renovates the rundown mansion into a hotel with the help of a local caretaker named Sharath (Karunakaran), who was under the care of Kiran's father before and his bombshell sister Saranya (Oviya). Hence, the catfight happens between Smitha (Rupa Manjari),Saranya (Oviya). Customers begin to come as soon the hotel was opened. A husband and wife, a newly married couple with relatives, and a bodybuilder die in the premise after staying for one night. The dead bodies are buried on the backyard. All the guests die except the schoolkids and teacher who were sent by the local police.

Baffled, Kiran tries to uncover the mystery behind the deaths, only to find the dead people were previous owner of the bungalow, which leads him to believe that the house is haunted. His suspicions are confirmed when things start going awry in the house, indicating some supernatural presence. They soon go to seek help from brother Adaikalam (Mayilsamy), who is a cheat. They kidnap him and bring him to the house. The foursome catch an old man inside the house, assuming that he is a thief. However, the old man says that he and the others will die if they leave the hotel. He narrates that the house was haunted by a ghost — Mohini (Anaswara Kumar), who would kill the house's owner.

Soon, the ghost starts to possess the people in the house and attacks Kiran. The gang is finally cornered with no chance of escape. It is said that they would die by midnight. Hearing someone banging on the door, Kiran opens the door to find the don, his son, and his thugs. The don asks for the house in return for the money he conned from him. Feeling pity for them, Kiran warns them about the spirit. Not listening to Kiran, the don forces him to sign the papers for the house. Kiran and his friends are let go, and they see the spirits of the previous owners on their way out. Just as they go out, they find the don and his thugs outside. Knowing that the ghost has killed the don's group since it is midnight, Kiran and his group walk away.

Cast

 Kreshna as Kiran 
 Oviya as Saranya 
 Rupa Manjari as Smitha 
 Karunakaran as Sharath 
 Anaswara Kumar as Mohini
 Aadhav Kannadasan as Young Thamizh
Nalinikanth as Old Thamizh
 Mayilswamy as Adaikalam "Brother"
 Bose Venkat as Arunachalam
 Devipriya as Arunachalam's wife
 Yogi Babu as Panni Moonji Vaaya
 Mahanadhi Shankar as Don Durai
 Balaji as Sitaram
 Namo Narayana as Guest
 Vinodh Munna as Doctor
 Daniel Annie Pope as Romba Sumar Moonji Kumaru (cameo appearance)
 Sona Heiden as herself
 Devdas Devasahayam as PT Master

Release
The film released on May 9, 2014. Its satellite rights were sold to Zee Tamizh.

Soundtrack

Critical reception
The Hindu called the film "a surprisingly well-made ‘horror-comedy’ that succeeds in continuously exploiting our irrational fear of the unknown even while nudging us to laugh at it...this is a fun summer film and should work regardless of whether one believes in the supernatural or not". Sify wrote, "Yaamirukka Bayamey is something different within the commercial format and provides potent dose of laughs to release the tension built up by the scares". Indiaglitz.com wrote, "The film, no doubt, is a compelling entertainer...with Yaamirukka Bayamey, debutante Deekay has secured a place for himself in the competitive industry". The Times of India gave it 3 stars out of 5 and wrote, "The horror genre's mandatory elements are all here...but Deekay nicely subverts some of these cliches...Also, he doesn't try to spoof the genre's tropes to elicit laughs but chooses to bring out the humour in other ways. It is this confidence that makes the film work". Rediff gave 2.5 stars out of 5 and wrote, "A clever script, good all round performances along with excellent support from the technical team make Deekay’s Yaamirukka Bayamey definitely worth a watch". Deccan Chronicle wrote, "Some cheap thrills, enough screams, a whole lot of clichés with some laughs thrown in for good measure. With all the right elements in place, Yaamirukka Bayamey delivers what is expected of it".

Music director SN Prasad received good reviews for his music for which he has given the credit to all his mentors including the director, producers and support staff.

Box office
In its opening weekend the film grossed over ₹32 lakh at the Chennai box office  and approximately ₹2.42 crore from 262 screens in Tamil Nadu,. Due to positive reviews and word-of-mouth the collections picked up and by the end of first week the film had grossed around ₹2 crore.

See also
List of ghost films

References

External links
 

2014 films
2014 comedy horror films
Indian horror film remakes
Indian comedy horror films
Tamil films remade in other languages
2010s Tamil-language films
Indian remakes of South Korean films
2014 directorial debut films